Michael O'Gorman may refer to:
 Michael O'Gorman (footballer)
 Michael O'Gorman (rowing)